The Sudbury Municipal election in 1929 was scheduled for December 1, 1929.  On November 23, 1929 the City of Sudbury, Ontario declared Peter Fenton mayor. In addition to the Mayor's post, City Council was also acclaimed.

1929 Election results

The results of the Mayoral and Aldermanic contests as reported by the Sudbury Star on November 23, 1929 are as follows:

References

1929
1929 in Ontario
1929 elections in Canada